Virgatosphinctes is an extinct genus of ammonites, which lived in the Tithonian stage of the Jurassic period, from 150.8 to 140.2 Ma . Its fossils have been found in Antarctica, China, Cuba, India, Nepal, Russia and Yemen.

References 

 Paleobiology Database
 Sepkoski's Online Genus Database
 Science Photo

Ammonitida genera
Jurassic ammonites
Jurassic animals of Asia
Perisphinctidae